A 10-feet-high statue of Christopher Columbus is located in Alameda de Acho, Lima, Peru. It was erected on 4 August 1860 by Spanish sculptor Paz-Soldán. The statue was originally sited on the Avenida 9 de Diciembre (Paseo Colón), but by the 1940s it had been moved to its current location. It underwent renovation in 2020.

References

1860 sculptures
Buildings and structures in Lima
Outdoor sculptures in Peru
Relocated buildings and structures
Statues in Peru
Statues of Christopher Columbus